Odostomia microeques is a species of sea snail, a marine gastropod mollusc in the family Pyramidellidae, the pyrams and their allies.

Description
The shell grows to a length of 1 mm.

Distribution
This species occurs in the following locations:
 European waters (ERMS scope) : Madeira

References

External links
 To Biodiversity Heritage Library (1 publication)
 To CLEMAM
 To Encyclopedia of Life
 To USNM Invertebrate Zoology Mollusca Collection
 To World Register of Marine Species

microeques
Gastropods described in 1999